is a passenger railway station located in the city of Izumiōtsu, Osaka Prefecture, Japan, operated by the private railway operator Nankai Electric Railway. It has the station number "NK18".

Lines

Layout
The station consists of two opposed side platforms. The platforms are independent of one another, and passengers wishing to change platforms must exit and re-enter the station.

Platforms

Adjacent stations

History
Kita-Sukematsu  Station opened on December 28, 1957.

Passenger statistics
In fiscal 2019, the station was used by an average of 12,574 passengers daily.

Surrounding area
 Kitasukematsu Shopping Street
Sukematsu Shrine
 Sukematsu housing complex
Osaka Prefectural Takaishi High School
 Osaka Prefectural Shinoda High School

See also
 List of railway stations in Japan

References

External links

  

Railway stations in Japan opened in 1957
Railway stations in Osaka Prefecture
Izumiōtsu